Haskins Montgomery is a Democratic member of the Mississippi Senate, representing the 34th District since 2008.

External links
Mississippi State Senate - Haskins Montgomery official government website
Project Vote Smart - Senator Haskins Montgomery profile
Follow the Money - Haskins Montgomery
2007 campaign contributions

Democratic Party Mississippi state senators
1952 births
Living people
People from Bay Springs, Mississippi
Mississippi State University alumni
Businesspeople from Mississippi